is a former Grand Prix motorcycle road racer. He was a two-time F.I.M. 125cc world champion. He is the youngest of three Aoki brothers who have competed in motorcycle Grand Prix races.

Aoki began his Grand Prix career in 1993 with Honda. He won two consecutive 125cc world championships in 1995 and 1996 with Honda before moving up to the 250cc class in 1997. After two years in the 250cc class, Aoki made the move to the 500cc class in 1999. In , he competed in the Superbike World Championship on a Ducati before returning to Grand Prix racing in 2001. Racing a V-twin, two-stroke Honda NSR500V, he finished the season as the top privateer. He almost pulled off an upset that year when he "won" the second half of the restarted Italian Grand Prix in torrential rain, but the race was decided on aggregate times from the first and second parts, meaning he was classified only fifth. Aoki retired after the 2002 season.

Afterwards, he participated in the Japanese Auto Race series. He returned to Road Racing in 2016, when he raced in the MFJ All-Japan Road Race JP250 Championship aboard a Yamaha YZF-R25.

Races by year
(key) (Races in bold indicate pole position, races in italics indicate fastest lap)

References 

Japanese motorcycle racers
125cc World Championship riders
250cc World Championship riders
500cc World Championship riders
Superbike World Championship riders
1976 births
Living people
125cc World Riders' Champions